Justice Nelson refers to Samuel Nelson (1792–1873), associate justice of the United States Supreme Court. Justice Nelson may also refer to:

Adrienne Nelson (born 1967), associate justice of the Oregon Supreme Court
George B. Nelson (1876–1943), associate justice of the Wisconsin Supreme Court
James C. Nelson (born 1944), associate justice of the Montana Supreme Court
Madison Nelson  (1803–1870), judge of the Maryland Court of Appeals
Martin A. Nelson (1889–1979), associate justice of the Minnesota Supreme Court
Thomas Amos Rogers Nelson (1812–1873), associate justice of the Tennessee Supreme Court
Thomas Nelson (Oregon judge) (1819–1907), the 2nd chief justice of the Oregon Supreme Court